

Anita Stukāne (née Balode, born 9 February 1954) is a Latvian former Soviet track and field athlete who competed in the long jump.

Her career flourished very briefly in the late seventies and early eighties. She first rose to prominence in 1978 when a jump of  ranked her tenth in the world for the season.

The 1979 season marked the pinnacle of her long jumping career. She won her first and only national title at the Soviet Spartakiad, clearing  to come out as the Soviet Union's top woman jumper. Only Brigitte Wujak jumper further that year.

Stukane continued to compete (later getting married and changing her name to Anita Balode-Stukāne), but her highest world ranking after 1979 was 20th in the 1981 season.

National titles
Spartakiad
Long jump: 1979

Personal bests
Long jump outdoors:  (1979)
Long jump indoors:  (?)

References

External links

Living people
1954 births
Soviet female long jumpers
Latvian female long jumpers
Universiade medalists in athletics (track and field)
Universiade gold medalists for the Soviet Union
Medalists at the 1979 Summer Universiade